Şakir is a Turkish name. Şakir or Sakir may refer to:

 Abdul Kayum Sakir, Afghan prisoner
 Cevat Şakir Kabaağaçlı, Turkish writer
 Bahattin Şakir, Ottoman politician
 Sakir-Har, Pharaoh of the Fifteenth dynasty of Egypt

See also
 Shakir
 Sakr

Turkish-language surnames
Turkish masculine given names